Parliamentary elections were held in Slovenia on 6 and 10 December 1992. The result was a victory for Liberal Democratic Party, which won 22 of the 90 seats. Party leader Janez Drnovsek was re-elected Prime Minister by the Parliament on 12 January 1993.

Results

Notes
Liberal Democracy of Slovenia did not yet exist in 1992. It was founded on 12 March 1994 at the unification congress as successor of three joined parties: Liberal Democratic Party, Socialist Party of Slovenia and Democratic Party of Slovenia.

References

Slovenia
1992 in Slovenia
Parliamentary elections in Slovenia
December 1992 events in Europe